Dimitrije (d. 6 March 1349) was a Serbian magnate who served emperor Stefan Dušan (r. 1331–55) as veliki čelnik ("great čelnik"). As a royal čelnik, the title-holder had a very high position at the Serbian court, often compared to comes palatinus. The veliki čelnik supervised over several čelniks, the čelnik being a commander of military fortifications (and presumably its troops) or a senior (starešina) of a larger number of villages. Dimitrije entered the service of Stefan Dušan before 1349, when he was mentioned with the title of veliki čelnik. Earlier, magnate Jovan Oliver had the title ( 1340). Dimitrije died on 6 March 1349 and was buried at the Monastery of St. Nicholas at Banja. According to the grave inscription, Dimitrije had held Gacko with Rudine, Drina and Dabar. G. Tomović theorized that this Dimitrije was the same person as the earlier mentioned nobleman Hrvatin (magnate Vojin's brother) who served King Stefan Dečanski (r. 1322–31) and held Rudine (1330). In 1350, Đurica and Andronik are mentioned as čelniks. After Jovan Oliver and Dimitrije, it seems that the title of veliki čelnik was not given at the Serbian Imperial court. The territories held by Dimitrije were eventually consolidated by Vojin's son Vojislav (fl. 1350–d. 1363). It was earlier believed that Dimitrije died in 1359.

References

Sources

14th-century Serbian nobility
People of the Serbian Empire
Medieval Serbian magnates
14th-century Serbian judges
Year of birth unknown
1349 deaths
Medieval Herzegovina
History of the Serbs of Bosnia and Herzegovina
Gacko
Rogatica